SSTL may refer to:

 Stainless steel, a corrosion-resistant steel alloy
 Stub Series Terminated Logic, a group of electrical standards for driving transmission lines
 Surrey Satellite Technology, a British satellite manufacturer
 Sistema Shyam TeleServices Limited, a joint venture between Sistema (LSE-SSA) of Russia and Shyam Group of India, to form MTS India
 Site Specific Target Level, a target used in the remediation of contaminated land